, translating simply "interval", is a Japanese martial arts term referring to the space between two opponents in combat; formally, the "engagement distance". 

The concept of  incorporates not just the distance between opponents, but also the time taken to cross the distance and the angle and rhythm of attack; collectively, these all factor in to the exact position from which one opponent can strike other – e.g., a faster opponent's  is farther away than a slower opponent. 

It is ideal for one opponent to maintain  while preventing the other from doing so, meaning that they can strike before the opponent can, rather than both striking simultaneously, or being struck without being able to strike back.

Types
In kendo,  has a more specific interpretation. In physical terms, it pertains to the distance maintained between two opponents. When  is interpreted as the actual distance between opponents, there are three types:
  — long distance
  — one-foot-one-sword distance, also called  (middle distance)
  — short distance

 is the distance equaling one step to make one strike. It measures about two metres between opponents; from which either need advance only one step in order to strike the other. At , there is a small margin of time to allow for a reaction to be made against an opponent's attack. But at  there exists almost no margin at all, so that at this distance one's attention has to remain constantly alert and unbroken.

Timing
In terms of time,  pertains to the momentary lapses of awareness that are manifested in the opponent's mind.

References

External links
The Kendo Reader (PDF)

 
Japanese martial arts terminology
Kendo
Aikido